Virbia polyphron is a moth of the family Erebidae first described by Herbert Druce in 1894. It is found in Mexico.

References

polyphron
Moths described in 1894